French Forrest (1796 – December 22, 1866) was an  American naval officer who served first in the United States Navy and later the Confederate States Navy.  His combat experience prior to the American Civil War included service in the War of 1812 and the Mexican–American War.

Biography
Born in Helen, Maryland,  he became a midshipman on June 9, 1811 and participated in the War of 1812. He fought with Commodore Oliver Perry at the Battle of Lake Erie and was present in the action between the USS Hornet and HMS Peacock on February 24, 1813. He became a lieutenant on March 5, 1817, a commander on February 9, 1837, and a captain March 30, 1844.  He was adjutant general in the Mexican–American War, and in 1847, he commanded the American naval forces in the landing at Veracruz, Mexico.

When Virginia seceded from the United States on April 17, 1861, Forrest was made its first and only flag officer in the Virginia Navy and assumed command of the Gosport Shipyard (Norfolk Naval Shipyard). When Virginia joined the Confederate States of America and merged its military on 6 June 1861, he joined the Confederate States Navy as a captain and kept his command, which he held from April 22, 1861 to May 15, 1862. In that capacity he raised and rebuilt the  into the casemate ironclad , which he expected to command; but that job instead went to Captain Franklin Buchanan. Forrest was then replaced as the Commandant of the Gosport Shipyard, because Secretary of the Navy Mallory thought he had been too slow to repair the ex-Merrimack.

Forrest then headed to the Department of the Navy offices and became the Chief of the Bureau of Orders and Details until March 1863. He commanded the James River Squadron twice, from July 10, 1861 to February 27, 1862 (while also commandant of the shipyard) and again from March 24, 1863 to May 6, 1864 when he became the Acting Assistant Secretary of the Navy.

Forrest returned to Washington to find that his property there had been seized, and died shortly after the War in Georgetown on December 22, 1866.

References

External links

 Inventory of the Forrest Family Papers, in the Southern Historical Collection, UNC-Chapel Hill.

1796 births
1866 deaths
Confederate States Navy captains
United States Navy officers
People of Maryland in the American Civil War
United States Navy personnel of the War of 1812
United States Navy personnel of the Mexican–American War
People of Virginia in the American Civil War
People from St. Mary's County, Maryland